Jacque T. Vaughn (born February 11, 1975) is an American professional basketball coach and former player. He serves as head coach of the Brooklyn Nets of the National Basketball Association (NBA). Vaughn played in the NBA for the Nets, Utah Jazz, Atlanta Hawks, Orlando Magic, and San Antonio Spurs from 1997 to 2009.

Playing career

High school
A native of Altadena, California, Vaughn attended John Muir High School in nearby Pasadena, where he maintained a 3.94 GPA, and became the best high school player in that area since former Muir and NBA standout Stacey Augmon. Vaughn excelled both on and off the court, and by his senior year was ranked as high as the no. 7 high school recruit in the country and the no. 2 point guard in the class of 1993 behind arguably the nation's top player that year, Randy Livingston. Over the course of the season, Vaughn averaged over 21 points and 19 assists per game, while also compiling six triple-doubles. Named a First-Team All-American by nearly every publication on the market, Vaughn rounded off his special season with a selection to participate in the prestigious McDonald's All-American Game where he put on a show, scoring only 6 points but amassing 13 assists (still a McDonald's record), while also thoroughly outplaying the higher-ranked Livingston once again—this time on a national stage (they had both matched up against each other in the All-Star Game of the 1992 Nike Camp), and was named co-MVP with North Carolina's Jerry Stackhouse in the process. After considering Georgetown, Indiana, UNLV, Arizona and UCLA, Vaughn decided to play for coach Roy Williams at Kansas, continuing, along with fellow recruit and college roommate Scot Pollard, the California pipeline of high school hoopsters to Lawrence, Kansas, started by former standouts Adonis Jordan and Rex Walters, and continuing in later years with Paul Pierce and Eric Chenowith.

As a senior in high school in 1992, Vaughn was awarded the Dial Award as the nation's top male high school scholar-athlete, becoming the first basketball player ever to win that award.

College
In his college career Vaughn became the starting point guard as a freshman after being chosen to replace incumbent starter Calvin Rayford. Among his first-year highlights were earning the MVP award at the 1993 Pre-Season NIT at Madison Square Garden in New York City and hitting a game-winning three pointer at the overtime buzzer to beat Indiana in an early season game at Allen Fieldhouse. Throughout his four years at Kansas, Vaughn was known as a good distributor of the basketball and effective defender with great speed and court awareness. By the end of his college career, he was the all-time leader in assists in Kansas basketball history with 804 total (since surpassed by Aaron Miles), as well as the Big Eight Conference's all-time record holder. In 1995, Vaugn was named Arthur Ashe Jr. Sports Scholar by Diverse: Issues In Higher Education. Additionally in 1997, the award given annually to the school's assist leader was renamed to include Vaughn, Miles and original assists leader, Cedric Hunter, as the Hunter/Vaughn/Miles Assists Award.

Vaughn earned a 3.72 GPA as a business administration major. He was a two-time Academic All-American at Kansas and the 1997 GTE Academic All-American of the Year. He was also a two-time all-conference pick and was named the Big Eight Player of the Year in 1996. His college jersey was retired on December 31, 2002, and hangs in the rafters of Allen Fieldhouse.

Professional
In 1997, Vaughn was selected 27th overall by the Utah Jazz in the 1997 NBA draft. In addition to playing four seasons in Utah, Vaughn also played with the Orlando Magic, the Atlanta Hawks (in two separate stints), New Jersey Nets, and San Antonio Spurs. He appeared in 64 games for the NBA champion San Antonio Spurs during the 2006–07 season and finished his career there, retiring after the 2008–09 season. Over his career, he averaged 4.5 points per game and 2.5 assists per game. He also set an NBA record for consecutive missed field goal attempts to open a season, missing his first 22 to start the 2001 season with the Atlanta Hawks. After those 22 straight misses he shot a career best 47 percent that season.

NBA career statistics

Regular season

|-
| style="text-align:left;"|
| style="text-align:left;"|Utah
| 45 || 0 || 9.3 || .361 || .375 || .706 || .8 || 1.9 || .2 || .0 || 3.1
|-
| style="text-align:left;"|
| style="text-align:left;"|Utah
| 19 || 0 || 4.6 || .367 || .250 || .833 || .6 || .6 || .3 || .0 || 2.3
|-
| style="text-align:left;"|
| style="text-align:left;"|Utah
| 78 || 0 || 11.3 || .416 || .412 || .750 || .8 || 1.6 || .4 || .0 || 3.7
|-
| style="text-align:left;"|
| style="text-align:left;"|Utah
| 82 || 0 || 19.8 || .433 || .385 || .780 || 1.8 || 3.9 || .6 || .0 || 6.1
|-
| style="text-align:left;"|
| style="text-align:left;"|Atlanta
| 82 || 16 || 22.6 || .470 || .444 || .825 || 2.0 || 4.3 || .8 || .0 || 6.6
|-
| style="text-align:left;"|
| style="text-align:left;"|Orlando
| 80 || 48 || 21.1 || .448 || .235 || .776 || 1.5 || 2.9 || .8 || .0 || 5.9
|-
| style="text-align:left;"|
| style="text-align:left;"|Atlanta
| 71 || 6 || 17.9 || .386 || .150 || .779 || 1.6 || 2.7 || .6 || .0 || 3.8
|-
| style="text-align:left;"|
| style="text-align:left;"|New Jersey
| 71 || 34 || 19.9 || .449 || .333 || .835 || 1.5 || 1.9 || .6 || .0 || 5.3
|-
| style="text-align:left;"|
| style="text-align:left;"|New Jersey
| 80 || 6 || 15.4 || .437 || .167 || .728 || 1.1 || 1.5 || .5 || .0 || 3.4
|-
| style="text-align:left; background:#afe6ba;"|†
| style="text-align:left;"|San Antonio
| 64 || 4 || 11.9 || .425 || .500 || .754 || 1.1 || 2.0 || .4 || .0 || 3.0
|-
| style="text-align:left;"|
| style="text-align:left;"|San Antonio
| 74 || 9 || 15.4 || .428 || .300 || .763 || 1.0 || 2.1 || .3 || .0 || 4.1
|-
| style="text-align:left;"|
| style="text-align:left;"|San Antonio
| 30 || 0 || 9.7 || .320 || 1.000 || .889 || .7 || 1.8 || .2 || .0 || 2.2
|- class="sortbottom"
| style="text-align:center;" colspan="2"|Career
| 776 || 123 || 16.3 || .429 || .352 || .779 || 1.3 || 2.5 || .5 || .0 || 4.5

Playoffs

|-
| style="text-align:left;"|1998
| style="text-align:left;"|Utah
| 7 || 0 || 3.4 || .200 || .500 || 1.000 || .4 || .6 || .0 || .0 || 1.0
|-
| style="text-align:left;"|1999
| style="text-align:left;"|Utah
| 2 || 0 || 3.0 || .500 || 1.000 ||  || .0 || 1.0 || .0 || .0 || 1.5
|-
| style="text-align:left;"|2000
| style="text-align:left;"|Utah
| 7 || 0 || 9.6 || .357 || .500 || .875 || 1.7 || 1.6 || .6 || .1 || 4.0
|-
| style="text-align:left;"|2001
| style="text-align:left;"|Utah
| 5 || 0 || 11.4 || .100 || .500 ||  || .4 || 1.6 || .0 || .2 || .6
|-
| style="text-align:left;"|2003
| style="text-align:left;"|Orlando
| 7 || 6 || 18.7 || .364 || .000 || .769 || .9 || 3.6 || .6 || .1 || 4.9
|-
| style="text-align:left;"|2006
| style="text-align:left;"|New Jersey
| 11 || 0 || 14.5 || .364 || .000 || .571 || 1.0 || 1.1 || .2 || .0 || 2.5
|-
| style="text-align:left; background:#afe6ba;"|2007†
| style="text-align:left;"|San Antonio
| 20 || 0 || 10.4 || .400 ||  || .500 || .5 || 1.4 || .2 || .0 || 2.2
|-
| style="text-align:left;"|2008
| style="text-align:left;"|San Antonio
| 14 || 0 || 6.5 || .273 || .000 ||  || .6 || .6 || .1 || .0 || .9
|-
| style="text-align:left;"|2009
| style="text-align:left;"|San Antonio
| 2 || 0 || 10.5 || .400 ||  || .500 || .0 || 2.0 || .5 || .0 || 3.5
|- class="sortbottom"
| style="text-align:center;" colspan="2"|Career
| 75 || 6 || 10.2 || .342 || .400 || .690 || .7 || 1.4 || .2 || .0 || 2.2

Coaching career
Vaughn was an assistant coach with the San Antonio Spurs from 2010 to 2012. On July 28, 2012, Vaughn was named the new head coach of the Orlando Magic. On February 5, 2015, he was fired by the Magic. Vaughn then spent the 2015–16 season working as a professional scout for the Spurs. He was hired as Kenny Atkinson's top assistant coach for the Brooklyn Nets prior to the 2016–17 season, and was promoted to interim head coach position in March 2020 following Atkinson's mid-season departure. On September 3, 2020, the Nets hired Steve Nash as head coach, while Vaughn returned to his position as assistant coach.

On November 1, 2022, Vaughn was named interim head coach after the Nets and Steve Nash parted ways, and on November 9, he was announced  as permanent Nets head coach. On February 21, 2023, the Nets signed Vaughn to a contract extension.

Head coaching record

|- 
| style="text-align:left;"|Orlando
| style="text-align:left;"|
| 82 || 20 || 62 ||  || style="text-align:center;"|5th in Southeast || — || — || — || —
| style="text-align:center;"|Missed playoffs
|- 
| style="text-align:left;"|Orlando
| style="text-align:left;"|
| 82 || 23 || 59 ||  || style="text-align:center;"|5th in Southeast || — || — || — || —
| style="text-align:center;"|Missed playoffs
|-
| style="text-align:left;"|Orlando
| style="text-align:left;"|
| 52 || 15 || 37 ||  || style="text-align:center;"|(fired) || — || — || — || —
| style="text-align:center;"|—
|-
| style="text-align:left;"|Brooklyn
| style="text-align:left;"|
| 10 || 7 || 3 ||  || style="text-align:center;"|4th in Atlantic || 4 || 0 || 4 || 
| style="text-align:center;"|Lost in First Round
|- class="sortbottom"
| style="text-align:center;" colspan="2"|Career
| 226 || 65 || 161 ||  ||   || 4 || 0 || 4 || ||

Personal life
Vaughn married his college sweetheart, Laura in 2003. The couple have two sons together. He enjoys reading and writing poetry.

References

External links

1975 births
Living people
20th-century African-American sportspeople
21st-century African-American sportspeople
African-American basketball coaches
African-American basketball players
All-American college men's basketball players
American men's basketball players
Atlanta Hawks players
Basketball coaches from California
Basketball players from Los Angeles
Basketball players from Pasadena, California
Brooklyn Nets assistant coaches
Brooklyn Nets head coaches
Kansas Jayhawks men's basketball players
McDonald's High School All-Americans
New Jersey Nets players
Orlando Magic head coaches
Orlando Magic players
Parade High School All-Americans (boys' basketball)
Point guards
San Antonio Spurs assistant coaches
San Antonio Spurs players
Sportspeople from Pasadena, California
Utah Jazz draft picks
Utah Jazz players